Hurricane Able was a rare hurricane that formed outside the typical North Atlantic hurricane season. Initially subtropical in nature, Able acquired tropical characteristics as it moved over the warm waters of the Gulf Stream and attained hurricane status on May 17 off the coast of Florida. This made Able one of only four May Atlantic hurricanes on record. The hurricane weakened as it turned eastward, and became an extratropical cyclone on May 23, before dissipating on the next day.

Hurricane Able did not affect land significantly. From North Carolina through New England, Able produced higher than normal tides. No casualties were reported.

Meteorological history

An active trough of low pressure exited the East Coast of the United States on May 12, and by the following day it passed near Bermuda. Initially the trough was located only near the surface, though as cold air from behind it advanced eastward, the trough extended into the mid- to upper-levels of the atmosphere. By May 14 a closed low pressure area developed in seclusion from the westerlies. Continued cold air from behind the trough, about 12° F (7° C) colder than usual for the time of year, extended across the low in conjunction with warm upper levels and warm sea surface temperatures, resulting in large amounts of instability.

Located under an upper-level low, the depression initially tracked briskly to the northwest, followed by a turn to the west-southwest on May 16 as the upper-level low turned southwestward. Later on the 16th, the depression approached the warmest waters of the Gulf Stream. The Navy reconnaissance squadron flew into the system later that day, and reported a storm of full hurricane strength moving southward.

Receiving the name Able, the small hurricane turned to the southeast and to the east while passing near or over the Bahama Banks. Able subsequently turned to the northeast and later to the north, and finished executing its cyclonic loop on May 20. The extratropical remnant turned to the northeast before losing its identity late on May 24.

Impact and records
Storm warnings were issued from Savannah, Georgia to Fort Pierce, Florida subsequent to the discovery of the hurricane. The National Weather Bureau advised all small craft to remain at port and recommended residents in the northern Bahamas to take immediate precautions. On Grand Bahama, the threat of Hurricane Able resulted in a construction crew to evacuate further inland; the crew was constructing an observation post for guiding long-range missiles from Cape Canaveral. Fishermen on dozens of boats left the open ocean for safety on two Bahamian islands, while two airplanes safely rode out the hurricane. Small craft warnings and storm warnings were later issued from North Carolina through New England.

The outer rainbands of Able produced light rainfall and high seas along the Florida coastline. While moving slowly near the Bahamas, Able produced strong winds reaching  at Walker Cay, and minimal hurricane force on Grand Bahama and Little Abaco Island. The hurricane produced high surf in Wilmington, North Carolina and abnormally high tides northward through New England, though no damage was reported. A ship called "City of Eastbourne" sailed through the storm and reported hurricane-force winds, along with "mountainous, confused seas and driving rain."

Able is one of only four North Atlantic hurricanes on record to exist during the month of May, the others occurring in 1889, 1908, and 1970. It was described as "wrong way, wrong time", referring to its unusual motion to the southwest near the Bahamas, as well as its presence outside the normal hurricane season. Additionally, the Weather Bureau described it as a "freak of freaks".

See also

 List of Atlantic hurricanes
 List of North Carolina hurricanes (1950–1979)
 List of off-season Atlantic hurricanes
 Hurricane Alex (2016)

References

Able
Able (1951)
Able (1951)